The Wilhelm Ernst War Cross was a military decoration of the Grand Duchy of Saxe-Weimar-Eisenach.  Established by William Ernest, Grand Duke of Saxe-Weimar-Eisenach on 10 June 1915, it was awarded to recognize military valor during World War I.  Individuals awarded the Wilhelm Ernst War Cross had to be recipients of the Iron Cross, 1st class, and were members of 5 Thüringischen Infanterie-Regiment Nr. 94 also known as the Grand Duke of Saxony's Regiment.  The cross was also to be awarded to citizens of the grand duchy serving in other units.

Recipients 

 Hans von Boineburg-Lengsfeld
 Otto-Wilhelm Förster
 Alexander von Hartmann
 Walter von Hippel
 Otto von Knobelsdorff
 Paul Laux
 Günther Rüdel

References

Orders, decorations, and medals of the Ernestine duchies
Military awards and decorations of Imperial Germany